Roswell, New Mexico is an American science fiction drama television series, named after the city of Roswell, New Mexico. Developed by Carina Adly Mackenzie for The CW, it debuted as a midseason entry during the 2018–2019 television season on January 15, 2019. The series is the second television adaptation of the Roswell High book series by Melinda Metz. In January 2020, The CW renewed the series for a third season which premiered on July 26, 2021. In February 2021, ahead of its third season premiere, the series was renewed for a fourth season which premiered on June 6, 2022. In May 2022, it was announced that the fourth season would be its last. The show ended its run on September 5, 2022.

Overview
After returning to her hometown of Roswell, New Mexico, the daughter of undocumented immigrants discovers her teenage crush is an alien who has kept his unearthly abilities hidden his entire life. She protects his secret as the two reconnect, but when a violent attack points to a greater alien presence on Earth, the politics of fear and hatred threaten to expose him.

Cast and characters

Main
 Jeanine Mason as Liz Ortecho, a jaded biomedical researcher and the daughter of undocumented immigrants
 Nathan Dean as Max Evans, a natural born leader and dedicated Roswell deputy sheriff, who has kept his true identity a secret for years
Michael Vlamis as Michael Guerin, a troubled but brilliant alien drifter, who survived a traumatic childhood and is trying to find a way to escape Earth
Lily Cowles as Isobel Evans, an alien and Max's sister, who keeps her true identity a secret by living her life with grace and enthusiasm
 Tyler Blackburn as Alex Manes, an Air Force veteran with his fair share of physical and psychological trauma. Alex prepares to abandon his dreams and the possibility of a future with the man he loves, Michael Guerin, to fulfill his father's expectations.
 Heather Hemmens as Maria DeLuca, Liz and Rosa's best friend, who is a bartender at the popular saloon the Wild Pony, and was previously oblivious to the existence of aliens
 Michael Trevino as Kyle Valenti, a doctor and the son of the town sheriff, who learns about horrible things that have happened in his family's past
 Trevor St. John as Jesse Manes (seasons 1–2), Alex's homophobic and violent father, a senior master sergeant with a secret to hide
 Karan Oberoi as Noah Bracken (season 1; guest season 2), Isobel's charming, devoted lawyer husband, who senses a secret in his wife
 Amber Midthunder as Rosa Ortecho (seasons 2–4; recurring season 1), Liz's older sister, who was apparently killed in a car crash while driving high on drugs, killing two other girl passengers in the process. Liz gradually comes to realize that Max may have been involved in her death.

Recurring
 Carlos Compean as Arturo Ortecho, Liz's father, who runs the Crashdown Cafe diner. He is an undocumented immigrant from Mexico and has been hiding his undocumented status for nearly 30 years.
 Kayla Ewell as Nora Truman, Michael's biological mother who was present at the UFO crash in 1947
 Rosa Arredondo as Michelle Valenti (seasons 1–3), Kyle's mother, who succeeded her late husband, Jim Valenti, as sheriff of Roswell
 Dylan McTee as Wyatt Long (seasons 1–3), the brother of one of the girls Rosa Ortecho killed in a car accident, who harbors a grudge against her family
 Riley Voelkel as Jenna Cameron (seasons 1–2, 4), Max's fellow deputy and partner In the fourth season, she joins the FBI.
 Sherri Saum as Mimi DeLuca (seasons 1–2), Maria's mother, who suffers from an undiagnosed mental illness typified by some temporary memory loss and her belief in aliens
 Claudia Black as Ann Evans (seasons 1–2), Max and Isobel's adoptive mother
 Kiowa Gordon as Flint Manes (seasons 1–2), Alex Manes' older brother
 Justina Adorno as Steph (season 2), the daughter of the hospital's director of Surgery who catches Kyle's attention
 Jason Behr as Tripp Manes (season 2), Alex Manes' great-uncle who was present at the UFO crash in 1947
 Cassandra Jean Amell as Louise Truman (seasons 2–3; guest season 4), Isobel's biological mother who was present at the UFO crash in 1947
 Gaius Charles as Roy Bronson (seasons 2–3; guest season 4), a farmer from 1947 who befriends Nora and falls in love with Louise
 Jamie Clayton as Grace Powell / Charlie Cameron (season 2), Jenna Cameron's sister who is on the run from the military
 Cleo Anthony as Diego (season 2), Liz's ex-fiancé whom she left in Colorado prior to her return to Roswell
 Christian Antidormi as Forrest Long (seasons 2–3), Wyatt Long's cousin and a love interest of Alex Manes
 Tanner Novlan as Gregory Manes (seasons 2–3), Alex Manes' protective older brother
 La'Charles Trask as Bert (seasons 2–3)
 Steven Krueger as Heath (season 3, guest season 4), Liz's colleague at Genoryx
Sibongile Mlambo as Anatsa (season 3–4), an investigative journalist
 David DeSantos as Edgar (season 3)
 Michael Grant Terry as Jordan Bernhardt (season 3), the son of Roswell's mayor 
 Gillian Vigman as Brooke Taylor (season 3), the town sheriff
 Quentin Plair as Dallas (season 3–4)
 Andrew Lees as Clyde (season 4)
 Zoe Cipres as Bonnie (season 4)
 Rekha Sharma as Dr. Shivani Sen (season 4)

Production

Development
In January 2018, The CW ordered the show to pilot, with Julie Plec set to direct. Production companies involved with the pilot included Amblin Television, Bender Brown Productions, CBS Television Studios and Warner Bros. Television. The CW ordered the show to series on May 11, 2018. On April 24, 2019, The CW renewed the series for a second season, which premiered on March 16, 2020. On January 7, 2020, the series was renewed for a third season. On February 3, 2021, ahead of its third season premiere, The CW renewed the series for a fourth season. The third season premiered on July 26, 2021. The fourth season premiered on June 6, 2022. On May 12, 2022, The CW announced that the fourth season would be the last.

Casting
On February 16, 2018, Jeanine Mason was cast in the lead role of Liz Ortecho. In early March, the rest of the cast was filled out, with Nathan Parsons as Max Evans, Lily Cowles as Isobel, Michael Vlamis as Michael Guerin, Tyler Blackburn as Alex Manes, Heather Hemmens as Maria DeLuca, and Michael Trevino as Kyle Valenti. Karan Oberoi was cast in the final series regular role of Noah Bracken on March 27, 2018. Trevor St. John was cast in a recurring role as Alex's father on March 12, 2018. In April 2019, Amber Midthunder, who played Liz's older sister Rosa in a recurring capacity in the first season, was promoted to the main cast for the second season. In May 2020, Tanner Novlan was cast in the recurring role of Alex's brother, Gregory, first appearing in the tenth episode of the second season. At the end of that year, it was confirmed that he would reprise the role in the third season.

Filming
Filming for the pilot took place in Albuquerque and Santa Fe, New Mexico. Production on the pilot begin on March 14, 2018, and ended on March 30, 2018. The rest of the first-season episodes began filming August 13, 2018, in Las Vegas, New Mexico; and Santa Fe, New Mexico. Filming on the third season began on October 15, 2020. Filming for the fourth season started in August 2021 and was scheduled to finish in January 2022.

Episodes

Series overview

Season 1 (2019)

Season 2 (2020)

Season 3 (2021)

Season 4 (2022)

Reception

Critical reception
The series holds an approval rating of 55% based on 20 reviews, with an average rating of 6.22/10 on Rotten Tomatoes. The website's critic consensus reads: "Roswell, New Mexico admirably adds modern political context to its premise, but this reboot hews too closely to its predecessor to transcend the pitfalls of a redundant retread." Metacritic, which uses a weighted average, assigned the series a score of 58 out of 100 based on 13 critics, indicating "mixed or average reviews".

Ratings

Overall

Season 1

Season 2

Season 3

Season 4

Home media
Warner Archive Collection released a manufacture-on-demand DVD of the first season on January 28, 2020.

Notes

References

External links
 

2019 American television series debuts
2022 American television series endings
2010s American drama television series
2010s American LGBT-related drama television series
2010s American science fiction television series
2010s American mystery television series
2020s American drama television series
2020s American science fiction television series
2020s American mystery television series
Bisexuality-related television series
English-language television shows
Roswell (TV series)
Television series by Amblin Entertainment
Television series by CBS Studios
Television series by Warner Bros. Television Studios
Television series reboots
The CW original programming
Television shows set in New Mexico
Television shows filmed in New Mexico
Television shows based on American novels